Hexedrone is a stimulant of the substituted cathinone class which has been sold as a designer drug. Through analysis of the Structure-Activity Relationships in similar cathinones such as MDPV, Hexedrone is believed to be a norepinephrine–dopamine reuptake inhibitor.

Subjective effects include stimulation, disinhibition, thought acceleration and euphoria.

Little is known about toxicity, addiction, and abuse potential of hexedrone. Due to its novelty and extremely short history of human usage, all information related to the use of this compound should be treated with caution.

Legal status 

In the UK, Hexedrone is a Class B drug under The Misuse of Drugs Act 1971 (Amendment) Order 2010 following the ACMD's report on substituted cathinone derivatives, making it illegal to sell, buy, or possess without a license.

See also 

 Ethyl-Hexedrone
 Methcathinone
 Buphedrone
 Pentedrone

References

Cathinones
Designer drugs
Drugs not assigned an ATC code
Stimulants